The 2019–20 season is the 137th season in Bristol Rovers' history and their 92nd in the English Football League. Rovers competes in the third tier of English football, the League One, as well as three cup competitions; FA Cup, EFL Cup and EFL Trophy.

Transfers

Transfers in

Loans in

Loans out

Transfers out

Pre-season
On 16 May, The Gas confirmed their pre-season schedule. The Cheltenham Town friendly had to be replaced at a later date and replaced with a match against Plymouth Argyle.

Competitions

League One

League table

Results summary

Results by matchday

Matches
On Thursday, 20 June 2019, the EFL League One fixtures were revealed.

FA Cup

The first round draw was made on 21 October 2019. The second round draw was made live on 11 November from Chichester City's stadium, Oaklands Park. The third round draw was made live on BBC Two from Etihad Stadium, Micah Richards and Tony Adams conducted the draw.

EFL Cup

The first round draw was made on 20 June. The second round draw was made on 13 August 2019 following the conclusion of all but one first round matches.

EFL Trophy

On 9 July 2019, the pre-determined group stage draw was announced with Invited clubs to be drawn on 12 July 2019. The draw for the second round was made on 16 November 2019 live on Sky Sports. The third round draw was confirmed on 5 December 2019.

References

Bristol Rovers
Bristol Rovers F.C. seasons